Al Haraka ( meaning the Movement in English) is an Arabic daily newspaper published in Morocco.

History and profile
Al Haraka was established in 1998. It is the official media outlet of the liberal conservative Popular Movement. The publisher is Al Haraka company. 

The paper is based in Rabat and has a sister French language daily, La Tribune, which is also owned by the Popular Movement.

References

External links
Copy of the newspaper machine-translated to English

1998 establishments in Morocco
Publications established in 1998
H
Arabic-language newspapers
Mass media in Rabat